This is a list of Portuguese television related events from 1998.

Events
Unknown - Carlos Bruno, performing as Michael Stipe wins the fifth series of Chuva de Estrelas.

Debuts

International
 Buffy the Vampire Slayer (Unknown)

Television shows

1990s
Chuva de Estrelas (1993-2000)

Ending this year

Births

Deaths